James David Thompson (January 11, 1920 in Indianapolis – September 1, 1973) was an American sociologist.

In 1932, Thompson's family moved to Chicago where he went to a public high school. He graduated from Indiana University with a B.A. in business and served in the United States Air Force from 1941 to 1946. He obtained a master's degree in journalism  and worked half a year as an editor for the Chicago Journal of Commerce before taking a position as a journalism teacher at the University of Wisconsin. From 1950 to 1954, he worked on his final degree, a Ph.D. in sociology from the University of North Carolina at Chapel Hill.

From there, he moved to Cornell University to teach at the School of Business and Public Administration. He helped found the Administrative Science Quarterly, of which he was the first editor, in 1956. He became the director of the Administrative Science Center at the University of Pittsburgh. In 1967, he published Organizations in Action: Social Science Bases of Administrative Theory, one of the most influential books on organizations.

Thompson moved one last time in 1968 to teach at the Department of Sociology at Vanderbilt University. He was diagnosed with cancer in 1972 and died September 11, 1973.

James D. Thompson's Typology of Decision Making:
 Where both preferences and cause/effect relations are clear, decision making is "computational". These decisions are often short term and information about the decision is fairly unambiguous.
 Where outcome preferences are clear, but cause/effect relations are uncertain, Thompson suggest that "judgment" takes over and you make your best educated guess. These decisions are based on prior experience and are often qualitative in nature.
 When the situation is reversed, and preferences are uncertain, then you rely on compromise between different groups. Political coalitions may be built which rely on negotiating and bargaining.
 When neither preferences nor cause/effect relations are clear, then you rely on "inspirational" leadership. This is where the charismatic leader may step in and this type of decision often takes place in times of crisis.

Organizations in Action 
Organizations in Action was published in 1967. The book is still today a classic multidisciplinary study of the behavior of complex organizations as entities. The book considers individuals behavior only in the extent that it helps explain the nature of organizations. James D. Thompson offers 95 distinct propositions about the behavior of organizations, all relevant regardless of the culture in which they are found. A central topic in the book is that organizations must meet and handle uncertainty. He classifies organizations according to their technologies and environments. Thompson saw technology as a dimension in understanding the actions of complex organization. Thompson recognized the benefit for managers of using a typology of technology that could be general enough to deal with a different range of technologies found in complex organizations.

A number of theoretical perspectives have developed subsequent to Thompson's work, most notably, organizational ecology and institutional theory.

References

 

1920 births
1973 deaths
American sociologists
Thompson, James David
Deaths from cancer
Indiana University alumni
United States Army Air Forces personnel of World War II
University of Wisconsin–Madison alumni
University of North Carolina at Chapel Hill alumni